What's Good For The Goose, also known as Girl Trouble, is a 1969 British comedy film directed by Menahem Golan and starring Norman Wisdom.

It was written and directed by Menahem Golan. The film features pop music by Electric Banana, otherwise known as the Pretty Things. The film uses locations around the Southport area, including the Birkdale Palace Hotel.

Plot
Norman Wisdom plays a 50-something assistant bank manager called Timothy Bartlett whose working life and marriage in London have become lacklustre. After the death of his superior, he is sent in his place to a bankers' conference in Southport, and he gives a lift to two fun-loving female students, Meg and Nikki (Sally Geeson). Initially annoyed by them, he ends up becoming interested in Nikki. Wandering around to find something to do one night, he ends up meeting her, at a Mod Band venue where the band The Pretty Things are playing.  After this, she comes back to his hotel where they spend the night together.

The following day, during the conference, he can only think of her. He abandons his work responsibilities to have a perfect day with her, taking in all the seaside amusements and recapturing his youthful energy. He tells her he has fallen in love with her and rents a 'love nest' for them. Her friend tries to warn him not to get too serious, as Nikki doesn't want a relationship. He comes back to their love nest, only to find all the hippies are hanging out there having sex, and have vandalised it. When he goes to the bedroom, he finds that Nikki is in bed with another man of her own age. Her freind Meg tells him he was just a two-day novelty for her and she has already moved on to someone her own age, and that's the nature of the free love scene.

However, inspired by the time he has spent there, he invites his wife to join him at the resort. She doesn't recognise him when he meets her at the airport, as he is now wearing counterculture scene clothing. He takes her to buy "young" clothes, and goes off with her to the places Nikki and he had gone to where he had such a good time. They replicate the perfect day he had with Nikki, though his wife doesn't enjoy everything as much as Nikki did. He finds he can have (almost) as much enjoyment with his wife, and ultimately, the couple embrace dressing "young" and doing cool now things.

Cast
 Norman Wisdom as Timothy Bartlett
 Sally Geeson as Nikki
 Sarah Atkinson as Meg
 Sally Bazely as Margaret Bartlett
 Stuart Nichol as Bank Manager
 Derek Francis as Harrington
 Terence Alexander as Frisby
 Paul Whitsun-Jones as Clark
 David Lodge as Porter
 Karl Lanchbury as Pete
 Hilary Pritchard as Cashier in Discotheque

Production
There was also a German dubbed version of the film which bears the title Öfter mal was Junges!! This version is 27 minutes shorter than the UK version running to 75 minutes instead of 102 minutes. It contains alternative longer versions of the hotel bedroom scenes in which Sally Geeson is topless rather than remaining in her bra as she does in the UK print (which is the generally available version). The text in the opening credits is completely redone in German over the same unfettered film sequence as in the UK version meaning it must have been prepared concurrently.

References

External links

1969 films
1969 comedy films
Adultery in films
British comedy films
Casual sex in films
Films directed by Menahem Golan
Films set in London
Films set in Lancashire
Films shot in Lancashire
Midlife crisis films
Southport
Films with screenplays by Menahem Golan
1960s English-language films
1960s British films